Fargo is a town in Monroe County, Arkansas, United States. As of the 2020 United States census it had a population of 57, down from 98 in 2010.

History

The town was founded in 1911 by formerly enslaved man Leroy Washington Mahon. Taking a  plot of his farm, having it surveyed and marked off into streets and lots, he made plans for a little town. A conductor on the Cotton Belt Railroad suggested the name "Fargo". Black home owners bought lots and built homes. The first established church in Fargo was called First Baptist and Bethel Presbyterian. 

Actress and comedian Sasheer Zamata is the great-granddaughter of Mahon. This was discovered on the TV show Finding Your Roots with Henry Louis Gates Jr. which aired on January 7, 2020.

Geography
Fargo is located in northern Monroe County at  (34.955140, -91.177179). It sits along U.S. Route 49, which leads south  to Brinkley and north  to Hunter.

Demographics

As of the census of 2000, there were 118 people, 41 households, and 31 families residing in the town. The population density was 70.1/km2 (180.5/mi2). There were 50 housing units at an average density of 29.7/km2 (76.5/mi2). The racial makeup of the town was 53.39% White, 45.76% Black or African American, 0.85% from other races.

There were 41 households, out of which 46.3% had children under the age of 18 living with them, 53.7% were married couples living together, 19.5% had a female householder with no husband present, and 22.0% were non-families. 17.1% of all households were made up of individuals, and 4.9% had someone living alone who was 65 years of age or older. The average household size was 2.88 and the average family size was 3.34.

In the town, the population was spread out, with 38.1% under the age of 18, 6.8% from 18 to 24, 26.3% from 25 to 44, 19.5% from 45 to 64, and 9.3% who were 65 years of age or older. The median age was 29 years. For every 100 females, there were 93.4 males. For every 100 females age 18 and over, there were 97.3 males.

The median income for a household in the town was $24,375, and the median income for a family was $28,750. Males had a median income of $19,583 versus $21,250 for females. The per capita income for the town was $8,634. There were 26.5% of families and 30.0% of the population living below the poverty line, including 31.8% of under eighteens and 72.7% of those over 64.

References

Towns in Monroe County, Arkansas
Towns in Arkansas